Logroño–Agoncillo Airport  is the airport serving Logroño in the autonomous community of La Rioja, Spain.

History
This airport is located near Recajo village in the Agoncillo municipal term. It first opened as a military airport in 1923, when it was known as Aeródromo de Recajo. It changed its name to Aeródromo de Agoncillo in 1932 when it was used by the Spanish Republican Air Force. In the late 1950s, the Spanish Air Force ceased most of its operations in Recajo and the aerodrome was transformed to an airport for civilian use.

Airlines and destinations
The following airlines operate regular scheduled and charter flights at Logroño Airport:

Statistics

References

External links

 Logroño–Agoncillo Airport at Aena website 
 

Airports in La Rioja (Spain)
Airports established in 1923
1923 establishments in Spain